Hungry Ghost Ritual (盂蘭神功) is a 2014 Hong Kong-Malaysian horror thriller film directed by Nick Cheung. The film was released on 10 July 2014 in Hong Kong and Malaysia.

Synopsis
After incurring debts from his failed business venture in China, Zong Hua (Cheung) returns to Malaysia after a decade's hiatus. The demoralised Zong Hua faces problems finding a job and tries hard to get used to things at home, including his estranged relationship with his step-father, Xiaotian, who runs a Cantonese opera troupe, and half-sister, Jing Jing (Cathryn Lee). Jing Jing is hostile towards Zong Hua as she always has the impression that the death of their mother was caused by the excessive fights between Zong Hua and his step-father.

Cast
 Nick Cheung
 Annie Liu
 Carrie Ng
 Cathryn Lee
 Lam Wai

References

External links
 IMDb entry

2014 horror films
2014 horror thriller films
Hong Kong horror thriller films
Malaysian horror thriller films
2014 films
Cantonese-language Malaysian films
Films directed by Nick Cheung
Hong Kong supernatural horror films
Malaysian supernatural horror films
2014 directorial debut films
Films about Cantonese opera
2010s Hong Kong films
2010s Cantonese-language films